The team ski-snowboard cross event at the 2020 Winter Youth  Olympics took place on 21 January at the Villars Winter Park.

Participants
Start order: Female snowboarder, female skier, male snowboarder, male skier.

Results
Four-team elimination races were held, with the top two from each race advancing.

Pre-heats

Heat 1

Heat 2

Quarterfinals

Quarterfinal 1

Quarterfinal 2

Quarterfinal 3

Quarterfinal 4

Semifinals

Semifinal 1

Semifinal 2

Finals

Small final

Big final

References

Team ski-snowboard cross